Altamiro Carrilho (born Altamiro Aquino Carrilho; December 21, 1924 – August 15, 2012) was a Brazilian musician and composer. He is widely regarded as a master flutist and a major representative of the choro genre.

Carrilho died of lung cancer on August 15, 2012, in Rio de Janeiro.

Discography
 Juntos (2002)
 Millenium (2000)
 Flauta Maravilhosa (1996)
 Brasil Musical - Série Música Viva - Altamiro Carrilho e Artur Moreira Lima (1996)
 Instrumental No CCBB- Altamiro Carrilho e Ulisses Rocha (1993)
 Cinqüenta anos de Chorinho (1990)
 Bem Brasil (1983)
 Clássicos em Choro Vol. 2 (1980)
 Clássicos em Choro (1979)
 Altamiro Carrilho (1978)
 Antologia da Flauta (1977)
 Antologia do Chorinho Vol. 2 (1977)
 Antologia da Canção Junina (1976)
 Antologia do Chorinho (1975)
 Pixinguinha, de Novo - Altamiro Carrilho e Carlos Poyares (1975)
 A flauta de prata e o bandolim de ouro - Altamiro Carrilho e Niquinho (1972)
 A furiosa ataca o sucesso (1972)
 Dois bicudos (1966)
 Altamiro Carrilho e sua bandinha no Largo da Matriz (1966)
 A banda é o sucesso (1966)
 Choros imortais nº 2 (1965)
 Uma flauta em serenata (1965)
 Altamiro Carrilho e sua bandinha nas Festas Juninas (1964)
 No mundo encantado das flautas de Altamiro Carrilho (1964)
 Choros imortais (1964)
 Recordar é Viver Nº 2(1963)
 Bossa Nova in Rio (1963)
 Recordar é Viver nº 3 (1963)
 A Bandinha viaja pelo Norte (1962)
 Vai Da Valsa (1961)
 Desfile de Sucessos (1961)
 O melhor para dançar - Flauta e Órgão (1961)
 Era só o que flautava (1960)
 A bordo do Vera Cruz (1960)
 Parada de Sucessos (1960)
 Chorinhos em desfile (1959)
 Dobrados em desfile (1959)
 Boleros em desfile nº 2 (1959)
 Altamiro Carrilho e sua bandinha na TV - nº 2 (1958)
 Homenagem ao Rei Momo (1958)
 Boleros em Desfile (1958)
 Enquanto houver amor (1958)
 Recordar é viver (1958)
 Revivendo Pattápio (1957)
 Altamiro Carrilho e sua flauta azul (1957)
 Ouvindo Altamiro Carrilho (1957)
 Natal (1957)
 Altamiro Carrilho e sua bandinha na TV (1957)

External links
 Official website

References

1924 births
2012 deaths
21st-century classical composers
Brazilian male composers
People from Rio de Janeiro (state)
Choro musicians
Brazilian flautists
Deaths from lung cancer
Male classical composers
21st-century male musicians
21st-century flautists